Luo Shugang (born 27 May 1955) is a Chinese politician. He has been the Minister of Culture since December 2014. He formerly served as executive deputy director of the Publicity Department of the Chinese Communist Party.

Luo is a native of Nangong, Hebei province. He began working in February 1971, and joined the Chinese Communist Party (CCP) in September 1981. He has a master's degree from the Central Party School of the CPC. In August 2006, he was named chief of the Office of the Central Guidance Commission on Building Spiritual Civilization. 

Luo is a full member of the 18th and 19th Central Committees of the Chinese Communist Party.

References 

Living people
1955 births
Ministers of Culture of the People's Republic of China
Chinese Communist Party politicians from Hebei
People's Republic of China politicians from Hebei
Members of the 18th Central Committee of the Chinese Communist Party
Members of the 19th Central Committee of the Chinese Communist Party